Bradford Wayne Edwards (born February 22, 1966) is a former American football safety who played nine seasons in the National Football League (NFL) for the Minnesota Vikings, Washington Redskins, and the Atlanta Falcons. He is currently the Chief Executive Officer at the NFL Alumni Association.

Early life
Edwards was born in Lumberton, North Carolina and graduated from Douglas Byrd High School in Fayetteville, North Carolina in 1984.  He then attended and played college football at the University of South Carolina.  In May 2011, Edwards was inducted into the South Carolina Athletic Hall of Fame.

Professional career
Edwards was drafted in the second round of the 1988 NFL Draft by the Minnesota Vikings.  He then played for the Washington Redskins and started in Super Bowl XXVI against the Buffalo Bills, had two interceptions, and was runner-up MVP.  He finished his career with the Atlanta Falcons, even though he signed with the Green Bay Packers for the  training camp, but was cut as he didn't make the Packers' 53-man roster heading into the  season.

After football
Edwards previously served as an assistant athletic director and senior associate athletic director at the University of South Carolina (1999–2006) under the tutelage of athletic director Mike McGee. Following his tenure at USC, Edwards entered the private sector at IMI Resort Holdings, Inc. Edwards officially returned to athletics on May 17, 2009, when he was named the athletic director at Newberry College. He is also the former Director of Athletics at Jacksonville University in Jacksonville, Florida.  In June 2014, he accepted a position as Director of Athletics at George Mason University. In October 2022, Brad accepted his current role as Chief Executive Officer (CEO) of the NFL Alumni Association. Founded in 1967, NFL Alumni Association is a 501(c)(3) nonprofit organization that is composed of former National Football League (NFL) players, coaches, team staff members, former cheerleaders and associate members. NFL Alumni Association mission is "Caring for Kids" and "Caring for Our Own". Edwards can also frequently be heard on Columbia's ESPN Radio station 93.1.

Personal life
Edwards is married to the former Marlana Brown of Hodges, South Carolina and has three sons - Jackson, Thomas, and Colton - and a daughter, Hastings.

External links
 

1966 births
Living people
American football safeties
Atlanta Falcons players
George Mason Patriots athletic directors
Jacksonville Dolphins athletic directors
Minnesota Vikings players
Newberry Wolves athletic directors
South Carolina Gamecocks football players
Washington Redskins players
Sportspeople from Fayetteville, North Carolina
People from Lumberton, North Carolina
Players of American football from North Carolina